Cathedral Square station is a light rail station on the Blue Line of the Sacramento RT Light Rail system operated by the Sacramento Regional Transit District. The station's platforms are located in an at-grade, street running portion of the line in Downtown Sacramento along K Street, with the northbound platform at its intersection with 11th Street and the southbound platform at its intersection with 10th Street.

The stop is located near many office buildings, the Sacramento Pyramid Breweries restaurant, and the Cathedral of the Blessed Sacrament.

References 

Sacramento Regional Transit light rail stations
Railway stations in the United States opened in 1987